Sonnenberg was a county ruled by the comital Waldburg family of Upper Swabia, located around Nüziders-Sonnenberg in Vorarlberg, then part of Tyrol (Austria).

Sonnenberg was a partition of Waldburg and was annexed by the Archduchy of Austria in 1511.

The Habsburg monarchs continued carrying the title of "Count of Sonnenberg" in the grand title of the Emperor of Austria.

States and territories established in 1424
1511 disestablishments
History of Vorarlberg
Counties of the Holy Roman Empire